René Combes (born 24 June 1937) is a French long-distance runner. He competed in the marathon at the 1968 Summer Olympics.

References

1937 births
Living people
Athletes (track and field) at the 1968 Summer Olympics
French male long-distance runners
French male marathon runners
Olympic athletes of France
Sportspeople from Toulouse
20th-century French people